Ricardo Teixeira Vieira or simply Ricardo  (born April 4, 1984), is a Brazilian goalkeeper. He currently plays for Esporte Clube Novo Hamburgo. He was born in Caxias do Sul.

Contract
Internacional (Loan) 1 July 2008 to 30 June 2009
Caxias 14 December 2007 to 31 December 2011

External links
 CBF
 websoccerclub
 zerozero.pt

References

1984 births
Living people
Brazilian footballers
Sociedade Esportiva e Recreativa Caxias do Sul players
Sport Club Internacional players
CR Vasco da Gama players
Fortaleza Esporte Clube players
Esporte Clube Novo Hamburgo players
Association football goalkeepers